Thioxanthene is a chemical compound in which the oxygen atom in xanthene is replaced with a sulfur atom. It is also related to phenothiazine. Several of its derivatives are used as typical antipsychotics in the treatment of schizophrenia and other psychoses.

Derivatives 

The derivatives of thioxanthene used clinically as antipsychotics include:

 Chlorprothixene (Cloxan, Taractan, Truxal)
 Clopenthixol (Sordinol)
 Flupenthixol (Depixol, Fluanxol)
 Thiothixene (Navane)
 Zuclopenthixol (Cisordinol, Clopixol, Acuphase)

The therapeutic efficacy of these drugs is related to their ability to antagonize the D2 receptors in the brain, though they have actions at other sites such as serotonin, adrenaline, and histamine receptors as well which mostly contribute to side effects.

The thioxanthenes, as a class, are closely related chemically to the phenothiazines. The major structural difference is that the nitrogen at position 10 in the phenothiazines is replaced by a carbon atom with a double bond to the side chain. This difference is noted in the illustration of flupenthixol, which shows a double-bonded carbon in the number 10 position (opposite the sulfur molecule in the central chain).

References

External links 
 
 MedlinePlus